KVLG (1570 AM) is a terrestrial American radio station licensed to La Grange, Texas, United States, simulcasting FM sister station KBUK, which airs a Classic Country format. The station is owned by Kbuk Radio, Inc.

References

External links

VLG